The Northern Illinois Huskies softball (officially NIU Huskies softball) team is the National Collegiate Athletics Association (NCAA) Division I college softball team that represents Northern Illinois University (NIU) in DeKalb, Illinois, United States. The school's team currently competes in the Mid-American Conference (MAC). NIU softball started playing in 1959 and has two NCAA Tournament appearances (1988, 1996) and one appearance in the Women's College World Series (1988). The Huskies are coached by Christina Sutcliffe.

Season-by-season results

Source: NIU Softball Record Book

Coaching staff
NIU softball head coach Christina Sutcliffe is the seventh head coach in NIU softball program history and took over the program starting with the 2013 season.
Christina Sutcliffe – Head Coach
Ashley Wade – Assistant Coach
Mickey Bell – Assistant Coach

Honors

All-Americans
NIU softball has had seven players named to the National Fastpitch Coaches Association (NFCA) All-America teams, including three First-Team All-American selections.

Academic All-Americans
NIU women's SOFTBALL has had 18 players named to CoSIDA Academic All-America teams, including eight First-Team Academic All-American selections.

Players of the Year
NIU softball has had two players named Player of the Year by the conference.

Pitchers of the Year
NIU softball has had two players named Pitcher of the Year by the conference.

Coaches of the Year
NIU softball has had five head coaches named Coach of the Year by the conference.

NCAA Statistical Champions
 Division-I: Batting Average
 1987: Jill Justin, .503
 1988: Jill Justin, .484
 Division-I: Most Doubles
 1988: Jill Justin, 18
 Division-I: Slugging Percentage
 1988: Jill Justin, .833
 Division-I: Most Triples
 1989: Jill Justin, 8

Notable alumni
Jill Justin, Outfielder, (1986–1989)

See also
List of NCAA Division I softball programs
AIAW Intercollegiate Women's Softball Champions
NCAA Division I softball career .400 batting average list
National Fastpitch Coaches Association Hall of Fame

References

External links